Fascism in Canada consists of a variety of movements and political parties in Canada during the 20th century. Largely a fringe ideology, fascism has never commanded a large following amongst the Canadian people, and it was most popular during the Great Depression. At the outbreak of World War II, most Canadian fascist leaders were interned under the Defence of Canada Regulations and in the post-war period, fascism never recovered its former small influence.

During the 1930s, the Canadian Union of Fascists was founded. Based in Winnipeg, Manitoba, it was led by Chuck Crate and modeled on Oswald Mosley's British Union of Fascists. Around the same time, in February 1934 in Quebec, the Parti national social chrétien was founded by journalist and self-proclaimed "Canadian Führer" Adrien Arcand. It later merged with the Canadian Nationalist Party in October of that same year. In June 1938, it merged with other fascist groups based in Ontario and Quebec (many of whom were known as "swastika clubs"), to form the National Unity Party of Canada.

At the outbreak of World War II, most openly fascist organizations and political parties were banned under the Defence of Canada Regulations. Arcand would spend the war under guard at the Petawawa military base alongside other 'enemy organization' leaders, while other members of the movement would be similarly interred in areas of New Brunswick.

See also
 Antisemitism in Canada
 Neo-Nazism in Canada
 Racism in Canada
 Christie Pits riot
 Paul Fromm (white supremacist) 
 John Ross Taylor
 Ernst Zündel
 James Keegstra
 [[MS St. Louis|MS St. Louis]]
 Fascism in North America
 Racism in North America
 Ku Klux Klan in Canada
 White supremacy

References

Further reading
 Betcherman, Lita-Rose. The Swastika and the Maple Leaf: Fascist Movements in Canada in the Thirties (Fitzhenry & Whiteside, 1978).
 Salvatore, Filippo. Fascism and the Italians of Montreal: An Oral History, 1922-1945'' (Guernica Editions, 1998).

External links
 

Canada
Far-right politics in Canada
Canadian far-right political movements
Political movements in Canada
Political history of Canada